A general election was held in the U.S. state of Hawaii on November 3, 2020. Paper ballots for voting by mail are being sent to all registered voters in the state.

State offices

Hawaii Senate

14 out of the 25 seats in the Hawaii Senate were up for election. Out of the contested seats, the Democrats won 13 seats while the Republicans won 1 seat. The resulting composition was 24 Democrats and 1 Republican. No seats changed hands.

Hawaii House of Representatives

All of the 51 seats in the Hawaii House of Representatives were up for election. The Democrats won 47 seats and the Republicans won 4 seats. The Democrats gained one seat, District 50.

Federal offices

President of the United States

Hawaii had 4 electoral votes in the Electoral College. Democrat Joe Biden won all of them with 64% of the popular vote.

United States House of Representatives

Hawaii had 2 representatives in the United States House of Representatives. The Democratic Party won all the districts. No seats changed hands.

See also
 Elections in Hawaii
 Politics of Hawaii
 Political party strength in Hawaii

References

External links
  (State affiliate of the U.S. League of Women Voters)
 
 
 
 

 
Hawaii